Kelvington is a town of 864 residents in the rural municipality of Kelvington No. 366, in the Canadian province of Saskatchewan. Kelvington is located at the intersection of Highway 38 and Highway 49.  
It is east of Saskatoon.

The town was named for William Thomson, 1st Baron Kelvin, scientist and inventor.

Geography
Kelvington is geographically situated in the parkland region of Saskatchewan and is surrounded by numerous lakes, Big Quill Lake, Little Quill Lake, Ponass Lake, Nut Lake, Little Nut Lake, Round Lake and Fishing Lake going around clockwise. Kelvington is 237 kilometers east from the nearest major city of Saskatoon.

Demographics 

Attractions

Round Lake
Marean Lake is located 40 kilometers north of Kelvington.
Fishing Lake Regional Park is located just 35 kilometers south of Kelvington.
Greenwater Lake Provincial Park is located 40 kilometers north of Kelvington.
Big Quill Lake
Little Quill Lake
Ponass Lake
Nut Lake
Little Nut Lake
Fishing Lake

Infrastructure

Transportation
Besides being at the intersection of a secondary grade and primary grade, Highway 38 and Highway 49.  Kelvington is also home to the Kelvington Airport CKV2 which has a 2500-foot turf runway with no winter maintenance.  Kelvington is also located along the CPR railway. and the Route 66 Snowmobile Trail.

Health care

The Kelvington and Area Hospital opened in June 2016. It replaces the aging facility opened in 1969. The hospital is an integrated facility containing seven acute care beds, medical clinic, 24 hour emergency services, home care offices, lab, and diagnostic imaging services. It also hosts several itinerant specialists including occupational therapy, public health, physio therapy and more. Attached to this facility is a 45 bed long term care facility that is currently being renovated, with completion expected by April 2017.

Ambulance services are located within the community and includes three ambulances with Advanced Care Paramedics.

East Central Saskatchewan Association for the Rehabilitation of the Brain Injured (SARBI) is a rehabilitation facility which is located in Kelvington and services a one hundred mile radius. This facility provides services and therapy for individuals who have experienced a brain injury from trauma or illness.

Media
Kelvington is serviced by the Northeast Chronicle and Wadena News.  The nearest radio station is located in Humboldt, Saskatchewan - CHBO-FM 107.5

Notable people

Kelvington has created a large collection of hockey cards commemorating hockey greats who have originated from Kelvington, Saskatchewan.  Lloyd Gronsdahl, Barry Melrose, Joe Kocur, Wendel Clark, Kerry Clark, and Kory Kocur are all featured on their cards with their NHL hockey statistics. This large sign is located to the west side Highway 38.

Kelvington is home to Guy Greffard, famously charged with a cold-case sexual assault of a minor in 1981 that occurred in Edmonton, Alberta.

References

Towns in Saskatchewan
Division No. 14, Saskatchewan